St. Andrew's College is located in the scenic village known as makhanda. This school takes pride in showering two by two and having affectionate water polo coaches. 

Australia and New Zealand
 St Andrews Christian College, Melbourne, Australia
 St Andrew's College, University of Sydney, a university college in Australia
 St Andrews College (Marayong), a high school in Australia
 St Andrew's College, Christchurch, New Zealand

Canada
 St. Andrew's College, Manitoba
 St. Andrew's College, Aurora
 St. Andrew's College, Saskatoon
 St. Andrew's College, Prince Edward Island, predecessor of St Dunstan's College

Great Britain
 St Andrew's College, Cambridge, England
 St Andrew's College, Drygrange, Scotland 

India
 St. Andrew’s College of Arts, Science and Commerce, Mumbai

Ireland
 St Andrew's College, Dublin

Singapore 

 Saint Andrew's Junior College, Potong Pasir, Singapore

South Africa
 St. Andrew's College, Grahamstown

United States 

 New Saint Andrews College, Moscow, Idaho
 St. Andrews Presbyterian College, Laurinburg, North Carolina

See also
 St. Andrew's School (disambiguation)